The Madwoman of Chaillot is a play, a poetic satire, by French dramatist Jean Giraudoux, written in 1943 and first performed in 1945, after his death. The play is in two acts.  The story concerns an eccentric woman who lives in Paris and her struggles against the straitlaced authority figures in her life.

The original production was done with Giraudoux's frequent collaborator, actor and theater director Louis Jouvet, who played the Ragpicker.  The celebrated French actress Marguerite Moreno was the inspiration for the piece. The play has frequently been revived in France, with the title role played by Edwige Feuillère, Madeleine Robinson, or Judith Magre.

Plot summary
The play is set in the cafe "chez Francis" in the Place de l'Alma in the Chaillot district of Paris. A group of corrupt corporate executives are meeting. They include the Prospector, the President, the Broker and the Baron, and they are planning to dig up Paris to get at the oil which they believe lies beneath its streets. Their nefarious plans come to the attention of Countess Aurelia, the benignly eccentric madwoman of the title. She is an aging idealist who sees the world as happy and beautiful. But, advised by her associate, the Ragpicker, who is a bit more worldly than the Countess, she soon comes to realize that the world might well be ruined by these evil men—men who seek only wealth and power. These people have taken over Paris. "They run everything, they corrupt everything," says the Ragpicker. Already things have gotten so bad that the pigeons do not bother to fly any more. One of the businessmen says in all seriousness, "What would you rather have in your backyard: an almond tree or an oil well?"

Aurelia resolves to fight back and rescue humanity from the scheming and corrupt developers. She enlists the help of her fellow outcasts: the Street Singer, The Ragpicker, The Sewer Man, The Flower Girl, The Sergeant, and various other oddballs and dreamers. These include her fellow madwomen: the acidic Constance, the girlish Gabrielle, and the ethereal Josephine. In a tea party every bit as mad as a scene from Alice in Wonderland, they put the "wreckers of the world's joy" on trial, and in the end condemn them to  banishment—or perhaps, death. One by one the greedy businessmen are lured by the smell of oil to a bottomless pit from which they will (presumably) never return. Peace, love, and joy return to the world. Even the earthbound pigeons are flying again.

Critiques
Theatre Arts magazine described the play as "one part fantasy, two parts reason." The New York Drama Critics' Circle hailed the 1948–50 production as "one of the most interesting and rewarding plays to have been written within the last twenty years", "pure gold, with no base metal" and having "an enveloping and irresistible humor."

Original productions
La Folle de Chaillot was translated into English by Maurice Valency, in Jean Giraudoux, Four Plays, vol. 1 (1958).

 first performed on 19 December 1945 in Paris at the Théâtre de l'Athénée in a production by Louis Jouvet.
 December 1948 – January 1950 production at the Belasco and Bernard B. Jacobs theatres on Broadway. This featured Martita Hunt (playing the role of the Madwoman for over 350 performances and winning a 1949 Tony Award for her performance), and John Carradine as The Ragpicker.
 1969: production at the Oxford Playhouse in Oxford, England, featuring Hugh Paddick.
 1969: Broadway musical adaptation of the Maurice Valency translation as Dear World, starring Angela Lansbury, music and lyrics by Jerry Herman, book by Jerome Lawrence and Robert E. Lee.  This won a Tony for Lansbury.
 1975: English adaptation by Maurice Valency at The College of Santa Fe Greer Garson Theatre, starring Greer Garson.
 1985: production from the Mirror Repertory Theatre at the Theatre at St. Peter's Church, starring Geraldine Page.
 1992: dance performance starring Maya Plisetskaya, choreography by Gigi Caciuleanu, music by Rodion Shchedrin; Paris, Espace Cardin.
 2016: re-adaptation and new English translation performed by Experimental Theatre Wing at NYU, directed by Cecil Mackinnon with original music by Johnathan Hart-Makwaia, performed at the Abe Burrows Theatre.
 2017: a new English translation by David Edney, commissioned by and performed at the Stratford Festival, Ontario, Canada.  Directed by Donna Feore, starring Seana McKenna as Aurelia and Scott Wentworth as the Rag Picker.

Film Version
In 1969, The Madwoman of Chaillot starring Katharine Hepburn was produced based on Maurice Valency's translation of the play.

References

External links
 
 
 
1952 Best Plays radio adaptation of the play at Internet Archive

Plays by Jean Giraudoux
Broadway plays
1945 plays
Satirical plays
French plays adapted into films
Paris in fiction
Plays set in France